Glimmer may refer to: 

GLIMMER, a gene prediction software package

Music
 Glimmer, a 1999 album by Sundown
The Glimmer Twins, a pseudonym used by Mick Jagger and Keith Richards of The Rolling Stones
"Glimmer" (song), a song by Delerium
 "Glimmer", the B-side to John Foxx's song "No-One Driving"
 Glimmer Best of John Foxx, a 2008 compilation album
 "Glimmer", a song by Tame Impala from the 2020 album The Slow Rush

Film and TV
 Glimmer (She-Ra), a television cartoon character
Gateway to Glimmer, alternate name for the video game Spyro 2: Ripto's Rage!
 Glimmer (or glim), a reflective device used for cheating in poker or other card games
 Glimmer, a character in The Hunger Games trilogy
 Starlight Glimmer, a character in the series My Little Pony: Friendship Is Magic